Keith Alexander Sims (born June 17, 1967) is a former American football player in the National Football League who played offensive line for 11 seasons between 1990 and 2000 for the Miami Dolphins and the Washington Redskins.  Sims and Richmond Webb were leaders on a dominant Miami offensive line in the mid-1990s.  He was elected to the Pro Bowl three times, in 1993, 1994 and 1995. The jersey number he wore was 69.

High school career
Sims played high school football in Warren, New Jersey at Watchung Hills Regional High School.

College career
After high school, continued to play college football at Iowa State University.  He graduated from ISU in 1990 and was elected into the Iowa State Hall of Fame in 2006.

Coaching career
On April 23, 2022, Sims was hired by the Seckinger Jaguars

Personal life
He is currently married to Tia, with whom he has three children, Keith Jr, Jayson, and Justin. He also has two children from a previous marriage, to Cam named  Cairo and Storm. He does sideline reporting for the Miami Dolphins Radio Network with play-by-play man Jimmy Cefalo and color commentators Joe Rose and Jason Taylor.

References

1967 births
Living people
Miami Dolphins players
Washington Redskins players
American Conference Pro Bowl players
Iowa State Cyclones football players
Players of American football from Baltimore
Miami Dolphins announcers
National Football League announcers